Guyuan County is a county under the administration of Zhangjiakou, Hebei, People's Republic of China. It was once part of the province of Chahar, and now borders Inner Mongolia. Bordering county-level divisions are Fengning Manchu Autonomous County to the east, Chicheng County and Chongli District to the south, Zhangbei and Kangbao counties to the west, and, in Inner Mongolia, Taibus Banner, Zhenglan Banner and Duolun County to the north. It is a primarily mountainous county in northern Hebei, and thus has a cold climate with long, bitter winters and mild summers.

Administration
There are 4 towns, 9 townships, and 1 ethnic township

Towns:
Pingdingbu, Xiaochang, Huangshandiao, Jiuliancheng

Townships:
Gaoshanbu Township, Xiaohezi Township, Erdaoqu Township, Da'erhao Hui Ethnic Township, Shandianhe Township, Changliang Township, Fengyuandian Township, Xixinying Township, Lianhuatan Township, Baituyao Township

Climate

Official links
Government website of Guyuan County, Zhangjiakou
Guyuan County Business Window
Guyuan County Administrative Rights Open Network

References

County-level divisions of Hebei
Zhangjiakou